This is a list of all teams and players who have won the Cork Premier Senior Hurling Championship since its inception in 1887.

By team

The 134 Cork Senior Championships have been won by 19 different teams. Blackrock have won the most titles. The current champions are Midleton.

By year

Individual records

References